West Tisted is a small village in the East Hampshire district of Hampshire, England.

The nearest railway station is the restored Ropley station on the Watercress Line, trains from which connect with the nearest national rail station  to the northeast, at Alton.

The village is home to a 12th-century church, which involves taking a small path over a moat bridge to find it. Alongside the church is an ancient yew tree, estimated to be more than a thousand years old.

West Tisted was the home of Sir Benjamin Tichborne, Knighted 1618, (born circa 1582-88 and died 1665) third son of Sir Benjamin Tichborne, 1st Baronet, (1540-1629) of Tichborne Park. Sir Benjamin is buried with his wife Margaret in West Tisted Church but he died without issue.

Tichborne lived in a picturesque manor house of red brick and stone, (now demolished 1955–56) it stood on a moated site, in very close proximity to the church, and was a very fine example of an Elizabethan manor house.

In modern times the village has been dominated by a large working farm, R.S. Hill & Sons, for which many of the residents work. The company also owns the current West Tisted Manor. The company's surviving proprietor is Ashwin Hill, the remaining son.

References

External links
British History Online gives a detailed history of the parish of West Tisted

Villages in Hampshire